Hu Guohong (born 1 January 1961) is a Chinese wrestler. He competed at the 1988 Summer Olympics, the 1992 Summer Olympics and the 1996 Summer Olympics.

References

External links
 

1961 births
Living people
Chinese male sport wrestlers
Olympic wrestlers of China
Wrestlers at the 1988 Summer Olympics
Wrestlers at the 1992 Summer Olympics
Wrestlers at the 1996 Summer Olympics
Place of birth missing (living people)
Asian Games medalists in wrestling
Wrestlers at the 1990 Asian Games
Asian Games bronze medalists for China
Medalists at the 1990 Asian Games
21st-century Chinese people
20th-century Chinese people